Medway Council is the local authority for the unitary authority of Medway in Kent, England. It was created on 1 April 1998 replacing Gillingham and Rochester-upon-Medway.

Political control
The first election to the council was held in 1997, initially operating as a shadow authority until formally taking over from the two outgoing councils on 1 April 1998. Since 1997 political control of the council has been held by the following parties:

Leadership
The leaders of the council since 2000 have been:

Council elections
1997 Medway Council election (New ward boundaries)
2000 Medway Council election
2003 Medway Council election (New ward boundaries reduced the number of seats by 25)
2007 Medway Council election
2011 Medway Council election
2015 Medway Council election
2019 Medway Council election

By-election results

1998-2003

2007-2011

This by-election was triggered by the resignation of Conservative Councillor John Ward

This by-election was triggered by the resignation of Labour Councillor Dennis McFarlane

This by-election was triggered by the resignation of Labour Councillor Bill Esterson

This by-election was triggered by the resignation of Conservative Councillor David Craggs

2011-2015

2015-2019

The by-election was triggered by the resignation of UKIP Councillor Catriona Brown-Reckless

The by-election was triggered by the death of Conservative Councillor Mike O'Brien

The by-election was triggered by the resignation of Conservative Councillor Kelly Tolhurst

2019-2023

References

External links
Medway Council
By-election results

 
Unitary authority elections in England
Council elections in Kent